Ulla Erna Frieda Jürß (born 2 August 1923) was a female Nazi and a concentration camp guard. It is unclear in her file when Jürß became a camp guard (estimated between 1942 and 1944).

Jürß was born in Rabenhorst, Germany. She went to Ravensbrück concentration camp where she was trained as an Aufseherin and served in several capacities. She was later promoted to the rank of Blockführerin, and had over 600 women under her control. She was reportedly a brutal block overseer in the camp. In October 1944 she was relieved from duty and went back home.

She was not tracked down until 1966, and until then, lived quietly in East Germany. That year, she was charged with crimes against humanity. An East German court found her and two other former guards, Ilse Göritz and Frida Wötzel, and sentenced them to life imprisonment. Jürß was released in May 1991. After her release, she filed a petition for rehabilitation and compensation for the time she spent in prison. The petition was denied. It is not known whether Jürß is still alive.

References

1923 births
Female guards in Nazi concentration camps
People from Poznań County
Possibly living people
Ravensbrück concentration camp personnel

German people convicted of crimes against humanity
German prisoners sentenced to life imprisonment
Prisoners sentenced to life imprisonment by East Germany
Nazis convicted of crimes